Qidong railway station is a railway station in Qidong, Nantong, Jiangsu, China. Situated north of the urban core of Qidong, it is the eastern terminus for passenger operations on the Nanjing–Qidong railway. It was opened on 5 January 2019.

Services
The initial service level was three arrivals and three departures per day. Provision has since improved. With the opening of the Nantong–Shanghai railway in July 2020, direct services to Shanghai Hongqiao and Hangzhou South were introduced.

References

Railway stations in Jiangsu
Railway stations in China opened in 2019